Landesberg is a surname. Notable people with the surname include:

Max Landesberg (1840–1895), Romanian physician and occulist
Steve Landesberg (1936–2010), American actor
Sylven Landesberg (born 1990), American-Israeli basketball player

See also
Landsberg (surname)